Bejamin Mielke (born 6 February 1981 in Perleberg) is a German Bobsledder who has competed since 2006. His best Bobsleigh World Cup finish was third in the four-man event at Igls in January 2007.

External links
FIBT profile

1981 births
German male bobsledders
Living people
People from Perleberg
Sportspeople from Brandenburg
21st-century German people